Arthur MacCormick (1864 – 14 January 1948) was a New Zealand cricketer. He played one first-class match for Otago in 1888/89.

See also
 List of Otago representative cricketers

References

External links
 

1864 births
1948 deaths
New Zealand cricketers
Otago cricketers
Cricketers from Sydney